Susan Hilary Spence AO (born 29 September 1953) is an Australian scientist whose work in clinical psychology is focussed on the causes, assessment, prevention and treatment of depression and anxiety in young people. Throughout the course of her career she has remained consistently at the forefront of this research area, has published widely and has been a regular recipient of national competitive grant funding.

She developed the Spence Children's Anxiety Scale, a psychological questionnaire used to assess children aged 8 to 15.

In the area of mental health she is or has been a member of a number of State and Commonwealth committees and grant providers. She is also on the boards of many international journals in the area of mental health. She is currently an Emeritus Professor in the School of Psychology and Australian Institute for Suicide Research and Prevention at Griffith University, Queensland, Australia.

Background and education 
Professor Spence undertook her studies at the University of Reading (Birmingham — 1971–1974) and completed her PhD at the University of Sydney (Clinical Psychology — 1976–1979). She also undertook a Master of Business Administration (MBA) at the University of Sydney (1983–1985). She was the Deputy Vice Chancellor (Academic) at Griffith University (2009–2014) and previously Dean of the Division of Linguistics and Psychology at Macquarie University (Sydney). She also held the position of Pro-Vice Chancellor (Quality and Student Outcomes) at Griffith University from November 2007 until March 2009.

Other appointments 
 Professor of Psychology, University of Queensland (1997–2005)
 Head of the School of Journalism and Communication, University of Queensland (2001–2002)
 Deputy President of Academic Board, University of Queensland (2002–2005)
 Head of the School of Psychology, University of Queensland (2002–2005)
 Member of the Board of Directors of Open Universities Australia (3 years prior to 2013)

Awards and honours
 Fellow of the Australian Psychological Society (1990)
 Fellow of the British Psychological Society (1991)
 Fellow of the Academy of the Social Sciences in Australia (1995)
 Founding Fellow, Academy of Cognitive Therapy (2000)
 Ian Campbell Memorial Prize for Clinical Psychology (2009)
 Officer of the Order of Australia (2016)

References

1953 births
Living people
Australian women scientists
Australian psychologists
Australian women psychologists
Academic staff of Griffith University
Alumni of the University of Reading
Alumni of the University of Birmingham
University of Sydney alumni
Officers of the Order of Australia
English emigrants to Australia
Australian Women of Neuroscience 2014
Fellows of the Academy of the Social Sciences in Australia